The Ministry of Culture (MOC) was a ministry of the government of the People's Republic of China which was dissolved on 19 March 2018. The responsibilities of the MOC, which were assumed by the Ministry of Culture and Tourism, encompassed cultural policy and activities in the country, including managing national museums and monuments; promoting and protecting the arts (including censorship of visual, folk, theatrical, musical, dance, architectural, literary, televisual and cinematographic works); and managing the national archives and regional culture centers. Its headquarters were in Chaoyang District, Beijing.

Duties 

The duty of the ministry was to digitize and preserve public domain works, and make them available and accessible to every citizen. China had millions of public domain works, including but not limited to books, pictures, music and films.

List of ministers

See also 

China Arts and Entertainment Group
Ministries of the People's Republic of China

References

External links 
Official website of the Ministry of Culture
Official website of the Ministry of Culture 
China Culture Information Net

Culture
China
China, Culture
China, Culture
1949 disestablishments in China
2018 disestablishments in China
Chaoyang District, Beijing